The División Mayor del Básquetbol de Chile, DIMAYOR (officially the Copa Club Kino for sponsorship reasons), was one of the national professional basketball leagues in Chile, along with the Liga Nacional Movistar. The league was created in 1979 and was discontinued in 2013.

Teams participating in 2012
San Luis de Quillota
Liceo Mixto (Los Andes)
Municipal Quilicura
Universidad Católica (Santiago)
DUOC UC (Santiago)
Tinguiririca San Fernando
Deportivo Virginio Gómez (Concepción)
Universidad de Concepción

List of Champions

1979: Thomas Bata
1980: Sportiva Italiana
1981: Español de Talca
1982: Sportiva Italiana
1983: Universidad Católica
1984: Universidad Católica
1985: Universidad Católica
1986: Universidad Católica
1987: Deportes Ancud
1988: Deportivo Petrox UBB
1989: Deportes Ancud
1990: Deportivo Petrox
1991: Deportivo Petrox
1992: Deportivo Petrox
1993: Universidad de Temuco
1994: Universidad de Temuco
1995: Universidad de Concepción
1996: Colo-Colo
1997: Universidad de Concepción
1998: Universidad de Concepción
1999: Provincial Osorno
2000: Provincial Osorno
2001: Deportivo Valdivia
2002: Provincial Llanquihue Puerto Varas
2003: Provincial Llanquihue Puerto Varas
2004: Provincial Osorno
2005: Universidad Católica
2006: Provincial Osorno
2007: Liceo Mixto Los Andes
2008: Liceo Mixto Los Andes
2009: Liceo Mixto Los Andes
2010: Universidad de Los Lagos Puerto Montt
2011: Liceo Mixto Los Andes
2012: Universidad de Concepción

References

Basketball leagues in Chile
1979 establishments in Chile
Sports leagues established in 1979